The State of South Sumatra was a federal state and part of the United States of Indonesia formed in the southern part of Sumatra by the Netherlands in 1948 as part of an attempt to reestablish the colony of the Dutch East Indies during the Indonesian National Revolution.

Background
In December 1947, the Dutch established a Body for the Preparation of South Sumatra to establish a federal state in an area originally planned to remain part of the Republic of Indonesia. Subsequently the Dutch also formed a 36-member advisory council comprising 30 Indonesians, 2 Dutch citizens and representatives of the Chinese, Arabic and Indian ethnic communities. This group then elected Abdul Malik as its chairman, and he became head of state when State of South Sumatra was formally established on 30 August 1948. It covered approximately one quarter of the area of the province of South Sumatra.

Government
Upon the establishment of the state, Abdul Malik was inaugurated as head of state by a representative of the Dutch crown in Palembang's Great Mosque. The people's representative assembly, a continuation of the advisory council, was the most powerful state institution, but the annual state budget was set by the head of state, and submitted it to the assembly for approval. A number of government departments were established, and ministers appointed as follows:
 Home Affairs Minister: Alwi
 Information, Culture, Science and Religion Minister: Mohammad Rasyid
 Development, Transport and Waterways Minister: R.M. Akip
 Welfare Minister: H.A. Polderman
 Justice Minister: F.P. Stocker
Many Dutch nationals held positions as heads of government agencies and mayors, including of the capital, Palembang.

Dissolution
By early 1950, there were growing calls for the constituent states of the RUSI to dissolve themselves into a unitary Republic of Indonesia. The South Sumatra representative assembly voted for reintegration into the Republic of Indonesia, and asked for the state to be placed under the control of a RUSI representative, rather than the head of state. The dissolution was facilitated by RUSI Presidential Regulation No. 126/1950, through which the State of South Sumatra ceased to exist as of 24 March 1950.

Notable people
 Abdul Malik, wali negara (head of state)
 Raden Hanan
 Bustan Urip
 Alwi, head of home affairs department
 M. Akib, head of transportation & public works department

See also

History of Indonesia
Indonesian National Revolution
Indonesian regions

Notes

References

 
 

Indonesian National Revolution